The Geheyan Dam is an arch-gravity dam on the Qingjiang River, a tributary of the Yangtze River, in Hubei, China.

The dam is located in Changyang Tujia Autonomous County (which is part of the  prefecture-level city of Yichang), just a few kilometers to the west (upstream) from the county seat, Longzhouping Town.

The dam was designed in 1987, and is equipped with a ship lift capable of lifting vessels of  displacement. The dam played an important role in helping to ameliorate the impact of the 1998 Yangtze Floods.

See also 

 List of power stations in China
 Ship lifts in China

References 

Hydroelectric power stations in Hubei
Dams in China
Yichang
Dams completed in 1993